The 22nd Senate of Puerto Rico was the upper house of the 14th Legislative Assembly of Puerto Rico that met from January 2, 2001 to January 1, 2005. All members were elected in the General Elections of 2000. The Senate had a majority of members from the Popular Democratic Party (PPD).

The body is counterparted by the 26th House of Representatives of Puerto Rico in the lower house.

Leadership

Members

Membership

References

External links
Elections result on CEEPUR

22
2001 in Puerto Rico
2002 in Puerto Rico
2003 in Puerto Rico
2004 in Puerto Rico
2005 in Puerto Rico